High School Musical: El Desafío may refer to:

 High School Musical: el desafío (2008 Argentine film)
 High School Musical: el desafío (2008 Mexican film)

See also 
 High School Musical (disambiguation)
 High School Musical: O Desafio, the 2010 Brazilian production